Gossett is the name of:

 Bruce Gossett (born 1941), American football placekicker
 Charles C. Gossett (1888–1974), American politician
 Colby Gossett (born 1995), American football player
 Daniel Gossett (born 1992), American baseball player
 David Gossett (born 1979), American golfer
 Ed Gossett (1902–1990), American politician
 Elizabeth Hughes Gossett (1907–1981), one of the first humans injected with insulin
 Hattie Gossett, African-American playwright, poet, and magazine editor
 Jeff Gossett (born 1957), American football punter
 Larry Gossett (born 1945), American politician
 Louis Gossett Jr. (born 1936), American actor
 O. Milton Gossett (1925–2006), advertising executive
 Philip Gossett (1941–2017), American musicologist
 Robert Gossett (born 1954), American actor
 William Sealy Gosset (born 1876), English statistician and brewer

See also
Gosset (surname)